Remigio Ceballos Ichaso is a Venezuelan military officer who, as of 2020, holds the rank of admiral and serves as commanding officer of the Strategic Command Operations of Venezuela. As a member of the Venezuelan Marine Corps, Ceballos advanced through rank promotions to his current position and has received military training in both the United States and Israel. He was previously an aide-de-camp to former President Hugo Chávez.

Career

On July 18, 2016, he was appointed head of the vertex "Comprehensive Security and Defense Plan" of the Great Sovereign Supply Mission, created a week earlier by President Nicolás Maduro. He has held different positions within the Venezuelan State, among which are: Director of Research, Training and Doctrine of the Second Command and Headquarters of the General Staff of the General Command of the Bolivarian Militia, Commander of the Bolivarian Navy Infantry of the Naval Operations Command of the General Command of the Bolivarian Navy and Vice Minister for Planning and Development of Defense of the Ministry for Defense until July 2015.

On March 16, 2019, he announced: "The entire Armed Forces are deployed in all states addressing the electrical, hydrological, fuel services, and telecommunications systems."

On November 5, 2019, Ceballos was sanctioned by the United States Department of the Treasury for acting “on behalf of the oppressive regime of former Venezuelan President Nicolás Maduro, which continues to be involved in egregious levels of corruption and human rights abuses,” said Steven Mnuchin, United States Secretary of the Treasury.

See also 
 International sanctions during the Venezuelan crisis

References

Venezuelan admirals
Living people
People of the Crisis in Venezuela
1963 births